Gran is a British short-lived stop motion animation television series narrated by Patricia Hayes and directed by Ivor Wood. There were only two main characters, namely Gran and her grandson, Jim, and they were lucky and kind.

Despite moderate popularity with young audiences in the mid-1980s, the series has not been seen on UK television since being repeated as part of the Tiny Living broadcasting block on Living TV in the late 1990s, and no further episodes were made. Universal Pictures released all 13 episodes on Region 2 DVD in the U.K. on 7 March 2005, but the release has since been discontinued.

Synopsis
At first glance you may think Gran is like any other Grandma, but she's not. Along with her grandson Jim, she takes part in different crazy adventures. Each episode sees Gran performing weird and wacky tasks – growing her runner beans up a dinosaur's skeleton, hang gliding, knitting a giant scarf to wrap around her house in the winter, and cross country motorbike racing. But one thing's for sure – she'll always be wearing her pink slippers.

Production and broadcast

The programme made by Woodland Animations was created and written by Michael and Joanne Cole. Ivor Wood produced thirteen five-minute short film episodes in 1982 and the series was broadcast on the BBC between 17 February 1983 and 12 May 1983,. In 1984 the BBC also screened the series as part of its See-Saw children's television strand (the "new" name for the cycle originally known as Watch with Mother). The series was then regularly repeated until 1989. Children's books based on the series, written by Michael and illustrated by Joanne Cole were also released in 1983. The shorts were also shown in the United States as part of the Nickelodeon series Eureeka's Castle, in the Latin American release on Cartoon Network's sister channel Boomerang. and, the Canada version, release on Teletoon

Episodes

Music

Finnish
Songs in the Finnish dub were sung by the actors of YLE Import re-using the De Angelis's music but with new Finnish lyrics. In the Finnish dub some scenes are cut, which includes musical numbers in some episodes.

Home media

UK VHS release
Castle Communications released one video of Gran with 12 episodes on it and it later got repackaged as a single title by the Castle Communications 'Playbox' brand of children's video titles (Cat. No. PVC 121).

On 1 June 1999, Castle Home Video (a division of Castle Music Ltd) had released a single video of Gran with all 13 episodes of the entire show on it (including Gran's Old Bones as its first episode along with the 12 other episodes of Gran from its original Castle Communications video release).

GOOF: The cover of Gran (CHV 2051) mistakingly contains 12 episodes on the back cover and credited as "12 classic episodes" on the front cover whereas the actual video cassette contained all 13 episodes of Gran.

References

External links
 

1982 British television series debuts
1983 British television series endings
BBC children's television shows
1980s British children's television series
British children's animated comedy television series
British children's animated drama television series
British stop-motion animated television series
Television series by Universal Television
DreamWorks Classics